Şahin Irmak (born 29 September 1981) is a Turkish actor.

Life and career 
Irmak's breakthrough came with his role in the TV series Karayılan as "Şiro". He then appeared in several different roles on Kanal D's Çok Güzel Hareketler Bunlar comedy program. In 2011, he joined the cast of Aşağı Yukarı Yemişlililer, portraying the character of "Sülo" (Süleyman). His first cinematic main role was in the movie Entelköy Efeköy'e Karşı in 2011. In 2012, he had a leading role in the TV series Sultan.

In October 2015, Irmak was sentenced to 10 months in prison by the 19th Court of Istanbul for "using drugs" and was acquitted for "establishment, management and membership" of a drug ring. The court postponed the sentence because the prison sentence was less than a year.

He then joined Star TV's program Eğlendirme Dairesi for 5 episodes. In January 2016, he became part of the comedy show Geldim Gördüm Güldüm on Show TV. Between 2018–2020, he had a role in the sitcom Jet Sosyete.

Personal life 
Irmak married actress Asena Tuğal in 2018 after two years of dating.

Filmography

References

External links 

1981 births
Living people
Turkish male television actors
Turkish male film actors
Turkish male stage actors